Project Nice Cote d'Azur is a Mongolian UCI Continental cycling team founded in 2018.

Team roster 2018

References

UCI Continental Teams (Asia)